Alan Ferreira Pereira (born in São Paulo on 13 May 1990), better known as Alanzoka, is a Brazilian streamer and youtuber. He is considered one of the biggest Twitch streamers in Brazil.

Career 
Alanzoka was born on May 13, 1990 in São Paulo. He graduated in Gastronomy from Anhembi Morumbi University. Initially, Alanzoka established himself as a YouTuber in the year 2011 on his channel “EDGE”, acronym for Electronic Desire Gamers Entertainment. His first video was from Minecraft, but he used to shoot videos of horror games, mainly Amnesia and Dead Space 2, as well as co-op games. His channel was boosted in 2012 with videos from Slender. As of 2018, he renamed his channel to "alanzoka" and started his career on Twitch, recording videos of Five Nights at Freddy's and Fortnite. In 2016, he was part of the Brazilian Overwatch team. Alanzoka also became known playing Rocket League and Valorant.

Legacy 
Alanzoka is often recognized as one of the best-known Twitch streamers in Brazil. In 2018, he was named one of the most watched Brazilian streamers on the platform, and was one of the most watched when streaming Valorant and Cyberpunk 2077. It was included in the list "Five Brazilian streamers for you to keep an eye on Twitch", by The Clutch, and in the list "Streamers to watch during isolation by the coronavirus", by Globo Esporte.

As of July 2022, with over 5.8 million followers, Alanzoka was the 20th most followed streamer in the world on Twitch. In 2019, it was one of the top earners on the platform.

References 

Twitch (service) streamers

1990 births
Living people